Enguerrand I ( 1042 – 1116) was the Lord of Coucy from 1086  until his death in 1116.

Bishop Rorico of Amiens established canons at Saint-Acheul in 1085.
The foundation charter records donations to Saint-Acheul by Count Enguerran of Boves and his vidame Eustache.
It was issued in the first year of Enguerran's rule, and praises his restoration of law and order.

Enguerrand was a man of many scandals. With the help of the Bishop of Laon he divorced his first wife, Adèle de Marle, for adultery. When he married his next wife, Sibyl of Château-Porcien, she was still married to Godfrey I, Count of Namur and Lord of Lorraine, who was absent and in a war. Enguerrand and Sybil's first husband became bitter enemies and continued to fight a private war.

Adèle's son Thomas de Marle hated his father and joined the enemies against him. Nevertheless, when in 1095 the First Crusade began, both he and his son joined in the adventure as part of the army of Emicho. Thomas succeeded Enguerrand upon his death, and became a notoriously disreputable lord in his own right.

Family
Enguerrand was the son of Drogo, Lord of Boves.

Enguerrand married Adèle (Ada) de Marle, the divorced wife of Aubry, Viscount of Coucy, and daughter of Letard de Roucy, Lord of Marle. Letard was, in turn, the son of Gilbert, Count of Reims and Roucy. Enguerrand and Ada had three children:
 Thomas de Marle (1073–1130/31). Lord of Coucy and Marle, Count of Amiens.
 Beatrix de Boves (−1144).  Married Adam Châtelain d'Amiens.
 Robert de Coucy.

Enguerrand is said to have kidnapped Sibyl of Château-Porcien, the wife of Godfrey I, Count of Namur. With the kidnapped Sibyl pregnant with Enguerrand's child, he later married her and they had a daughter, Agnès de Coucy.

References

Sources

1040s births
1116 deaths
People from Aisne
Christians of the First Crusade
Year of birth uncertain
Lords of Coucy